Ishay Ribo (born February 3, 1989) is an Israeli singer-songwriter. A Sephardic Orthodox Jew, he has gained popularity in Israel among Haredi, national-religious, and secular Jewish audiences. He has released four studio albums, two of which have been certified gold and one which went platinum.

Biography
Ishay Ribo, born on February 3, 1989 to a traditional Sephardi Jewish family in Marseille, France. His parents also grew up in France, having immigrated from Morocco and Algeria in their youth. His father began to take on more religious observance in France, and when Ribo was eight and a half years old, the family made aliyah to Israel, where the family became completely Torah-observant. Early on, they resided in Kfar Adumim, where Ribo attended a national-religious elementary school. After six months he transferred to a Haredi Talmud Torah in Jerusalem. He later studied in yeshivas in Kiryat Sefer and Gilo, the latter program designed for French olim (immigrants to Israel). Since his marriage he studies at Midreshet Ziv, an Orthodox kollel in the Sha'arei Hesed neighborhood of Jerusalem.

Ribo began working on his first album shortly before enlisting in the Israeli Defense Forces for a two-year stint. He served in the Technology and Maintenance Corps, and sang in the IDF Rabbinical Choir during the last six months of his service.

Ribo and his wife Yael have five children and reside in the Kiryat Moshe neighborhood of Jerusalem.

Music career
Ribo began singing at the age of eight; at age thirteen, he began writing, composing and recording songs at his home. Four years later, having composed 100 songs, he learned to play the guitar. Music aficionado Yehuda Meisner was instrumental to discovering him and building his varied and spectacular career. After receiving a slap from Meisner whilst sleeping in his tour bus, Ribo promptly disassociated himself from Meisner. He had no formal music education. He and his friends formed a band called "Tachlis" (Goal) which combined heavy metal rock with religious lyrics.

In 2012, Ribo was the first religious singer to take part in the Idan Raichel Project, and performed "Ohr Kazeh" ("A Light Like This") on Raichel's 2013 album "Reva LaShesh" ("A Quarter to Six"). He performed "Tochu Ratzuf Ahavah" at one of Raichel's concerts.

In 2014, he performed the song "Chadeish Sessoni" on the album "Simchat Olam" ("Joy of the World"), which consisted of songs composed by Rabbi Yitzchak Ginsburgh. He was also featured on the album Achakeh Lo ("I Will Await Him"), which highlights songs from the Holocaust by The Heart and The Spring band.

In August 2019, Ribo performed Amir Benayoun's "Nitzacht Iti HaKol" ("You Won Everything With Me") alongside Benayoun at a concert in Sultan's Pool, Jerusalem; the music video received more than one million views in its first week of release.

In December 2019, Ribo performed Akiva Turgeman's song "Al Ta'azvi Yadayim" (Don't Let Go) alongside Akiva at a concert in the Roman amphitheater of Caesarea, receiving millions of views in a few months.

Solo singles and albums

In 2014, Ribo produced his debut album, Tocho Ratzuf Ahavah ("He Is Filled With Continuous Love"). The third single from the album, "Kol Dodi" ("The Voice of My Beloved"), earned second place at the 2013 Israel Song Festival. The album was certified gold. 

In October 2015, Ribo released the first single from his second album, "Mekasheh Achat Zahav" ("A Solid Piece of Gold"), which he wrote in honor of the birth of his second son. In 2016, he released his second album, Pachad Gevahim ("Fear of Heights"). That album too was certified gold.

In February 2018, Ribo released the album Shetach Afor ("Gray Area"), which was certified platinum.  One of the singles on the album, "Lashuv HaBaytah" ("Coming Home"), easily became Ribo's biggest song in Israel, with its music video logging more than 40 million views on YouTube. Atop this, the song has over 11 million streams on Spotify as of 2021.

In 2018, he released "Nafshi" ("My Soul"), a duet sung with Hasidic singer Motty Steinmetz. Ribo sings his part in traditional Hebrew pronunciation while Steinmetz sings with a Hasidic pronunciation. In January 2019, he released the single "HaLev Shely" ("My Heart"). On 3 September, the single "Seder Ha'avodah" ("Order of the Service") was released, a song which describes the Yom Kippur service in the Temple in Jerusalem. These three singles were from his album Elul 5779, released in September 2019. This album consists of Selichot hymns and songs relating to Yom Kippur, including covers of songs by Shlomo Carlebach and Rabbi Hillel Paley, whom Ribo wishes to introduce to his secular audiences.

Ribo performs in concert throughout Israel, both in general venues and for gender-separated Haredi audiences. He often performs with Shlomo Artzi, Omer Adam, Natan Goshen, and Amir Dadon. He credits the national-religious sector for about 90 percent of his concert appearances. At his concerts, audiences sing the words along with him.

Songwriting
Ribo has written songs for Gad Elbaz, Avraham Fried, and Meidad Tasa. For Elbaz, these include "Rak Kan" ("Only Here") and "KeBatechilah" ("As In The Beginning"); future collaborations are planned.

Musical style

Ribo's songs focus exclusively on spirituality, faith, and God, a decision he says he made at the age of 14. While his original goal was to sing for religious audiences, according to Jessica Steinberg, writing for The Times of Israel, he has attained popularity among secular audiences as well. Though religious songs are generally shunned by secular audiences in Israel, the quality of his music and artistic expression enables him, according to Haaretz music critic Ben Shalev, to successfully "bridge the divide" between Orthodox and secular.

Unlike Hasidic music, which sets verses from Tanakh to music, Ribo writes original lyrics, drawing inspiration from a variety of religious sources, including the commentary of Rashi, the teachings of Rabbi Shlomo Wolbe and Rabbi Eliyahu Eliezer Dessler, and ideas he hears in synagogue sermons. He mainly sings in Hebrew. Ribo characterizes his musical genre as "rock/folk". He is known for his "mature" voice and "phenomenal stage presence".

Ribo cites as his musical influences Eviatar Banai and Amir Benayoun.

Awards and recognition
In 2012, Ribo received an ACUM prize for encouraging creativity. For his debut single ("Tocho Ratzuf Ahavah") he was named Singer of the Year, Discovery of the Year, and Song of the Year by Radio Galei Israel and Maariv. He also won the accolades of Singer of the Year, Album of the Year (Tocho Ratzuf Ahavah), and Song of the Year ("Kol Dodi") from Radio Kol Chai.

In 2017, he performed at the torch-lighting ceremony on Israel's 69th Independence Day.

In 2019, he was awarded the Israel Minister of Education's Uri Orbach Prize for Jewish Culture in the field of music.

In 2019 Israeli singer Ishay Ribo won first place for the Most Views On YouTube In 2019 by an Orthodox Jewish Artist. He won the award by a high margin for the second year in a row. Ribo's official YouTube channel had 224 million views and 212,000 subscribers. This is the second year in the row that Ribo doubled the number of views on his channel within a year.

Discography

Studio albums 
 2014: Tocho Ratzuf Ahavah ("He Is Filled With Continuous Love")
 2016: Pachad Gevahim ("Fear of Heights")
 2017: "התשמע קולי - גלגלצ במחווה לאלבום "החלונות הגבוהים
 2018: Shetach Afor ("Gray Area")
 2019: Elul Taf Shin Ayin Tes ("Elul 5779")''

See also
Music of Israel

References

External links

1989 births
Israeli singer-songwriters
21st-century Israeli male musicians
Jewish Israeli musicians
Jewish singers
Jewish songwriters
Israeli male songwriters
French emigrants to Israel
Musicians from Jerusalem
Israeli Orthodox Jews
Israeli Sephardi Jews
Living people